Robert Willis Repass (November 6, 1917 – January 17, 2006) was a Major League Baseball infielder.

External links

1917 births
2006 deaths
Major League Baseball infielders
St. Louis Cardinals players
Washington Senators (1901–1960) players
Baseball players from Pennsylvania